Sabtang Lighthouse is an active lighthouse in Sabtang, Batanes, Philippines.

See also

 List of lighthouses in the Philippines

References

External links
 Maritime Safety Services Command 
 Picture of Sabtang Lighthouse Ania Blazejewska Travel Photography

Lighthouses in the Philippines
Buildings and structures in Batanes